Romain Daubié (born 5 May 1980 in Villeurbanne) is a French lawyer and politician. Deputy for Ain's 2nd constituency in the National Assembly of France
in the 2022 French legislative election.

External Links

 His page on the site of the National Assembly

References

Deputies of the 16th National Assembly of the French Fifth Republic
Living people
1980 births